The WCT Tallinn Mixed Doubles International is an annual mixed doubles curling tournament on the ISS Mixed Doubles World Curling Tour. It is held annually in mid-September at the Tondiraba Ice Hall in Tallinn, Estonia.

The purse for the event is € 3,325 and its event categorization is 300 (highest calibre is 1000).

The event has been held since 2016.

The 2021 event featured many of the teams that had qualified for the 2022 Winter Olympics.

Past champions

References

World Curling Tour events
Champions Curling Tour events
Curling competitions in Estonia
Sports competitions in Tallinn
Mixed doubles curling